Tomtegubben ("The Brownie") is a mountain in Oscar II Land at Spitsbergen, Svalbard. It has a height of 779 m.a.s.l., and is located between the glaciers of Borebreen and Eidembreen. Tomtegubben is part of the mountainous district of Trollheimen.

References

Mountains of Spitsbergen